The Caribbean Footballer of the Year is an award given to Caribbean players who have had the most successful playing season.

Winners

References 

Association football player of the year awards
Caribbean Football Union
Awards established in 1993